Hobbs may refer to:

Surname 
Hobbs (surname)

Fictional 
Russel Hobbs of the virtual band Gorillaz
Luke Hobbs, a character from The Fast and the Furious film series
Lynne Hobbs, a character from EastEnders
Garry Hobbs, a character from EastEnders
Roy Hobbs, a baseball player in The Natural

Places

Antarctica 
Hobbs Coast

Australia 
Hobbs Island (Tasmania)

United States 
Hobbs Island, Alabama
Hobbs, Indiana
Hobbs, Kentucky
Hobbs, Maryland
Hobbs, New Mexico
Hobbs, Texas

Companies 
Arding & Hobbs, a former London department store
Hobbs Ltd, women's clothing stores in the United Kingdom
Russell Hobbs Inc, an American manufacturer of home appliances

Other uses 
Hobbs Act, a U.S. federal law
Hobbs meter, a device that records elapsed time

See also 

 Hob (disambiguation)
 Hobb (disambiguation)
 Hobbes (disambiguation)
 Hobbism